Ibero-America or Iberian America is a region in the Americas comprising countries or territories where Spanish or Portuguese are predominant languages (usually former territories of Portugal or Spain). Portugal and Spain are themselves included in some definitions, such as that of the Ibero-American Summit and the Organization of Ibero-American States. The Organization of Ibero-American States also includes Spanish-speaking Equatorial Guinea, in Central Africa, but not the Portuguese-speaking African countries. The Latin Recording Academy, the organization responsible for the Latin Grammy Awards, also includes Spain and Portugal as well as the Latino population of Canada and the United States in their definition of Ibero-America.

The prefix Ibero- and the adjective Iberian refer to the Iberian Peninsula in Europe, which includes Portugal and Spain. Ibero-America includes all Hispanic American countries in North, Central, and South America plus the Hispanophone Caribbean, as well as the Portuguese-speaking country of Brazil. Ibero-America makes up the overwhelming bulk of Latin America, but is differentiated from Latin America by the exclusion of the French-speaking country of Haiti, the French overseas departments of French Guiana, Martinique and Guadeloupe, and the French collectivities of Saint Martin and Saint Barthélemy. In addition, the countries of Belize, Guyana and Suriname, whose official languages are English and Dutch, respectively, are not considered to be either Ibero-American or Latin American.

Since 1991, the Iberoamerican Community of Nations organizes a yearly Ibero-American Summit meeting of the heads of state and governments of the Ibero-American countries, including Spain, Portugal and Andorra, this has since changed to biannually from 2014.

Countries and population in the Americas
 Spanish-speaking: (430,567,462 speakers)
  Argentina 42,669,500
  Bolivia 10,556,102
  Chile 17,772,871
  Colombia 47,425,437
  Costa Rica 4,586,353
  Cuba 11,167,325
  Dominican Republic 9,445,281
  Ecuador 15,223,680
  El Salvador 6,134,000
  Guatemala 15,806,675
  Honduras 8,249,574
  Mexico 118,395,054
  Nicaragua 6,071,045
  Panama 4,058,374
  Paraguay 6,800,284
  Peru 30,814,175
  Puerto Rico (U.S. Commonwealth) 3,667,084
  Uruguay 3,324,460
  Venezuela 28,946,101

 Portuguese-speaking: (211,520,003 speakers)
  Brazil 201,032,714

See also
 Iberian Peninsula
 Hispanic America
 Latin Recording Academy
 Organization of Ibero-American States
 Organización de Telecomunicaciones de Iberoamérica (OTI)
 Spanish colonization of the Americas
 Portuguese colonization of the Americas
 Postal Union of the Americas, Spain and Portugal

References

External links

Official website of the Organization of Ibero-American States (OEI) 
Official website of Ibero-America's Secretariat General (SEGIB) 
Official website of the Organization of Ibero-American Youth (OIJ) 
Digital history of Ibero-America from the 14th to the 18th century 
La Insignia, news about Ibero-America 
Pensar Iberoamerica, cultural magazine about Ibero-America 
Official website of El Ojo de Iberoamerica, one of the most important festivals devoted to Ibero-America 

 
Country classifications
Cultural regions
Catalan language
Spanish-language culture
Lusophone culture
Former Spanish colonies
Former Portuguese colonies
Regions of Eurasia
Regions of the Americas